Limoux is a railway station in Limoux, Occitanie, France. It is one of two stations serving the town: the other is Limoux-Flassian.

The station is on the Carcassonne–Rivesaltes line. The station is served by TER (local) services operated by the SNCF. Train services between Limoux and Quillan were suspended in 2018, and are expected to be resumed in 2025.

Train services
The following services currently call at Limoux:
local service (TER Occitanie) Carcassonne–Limoux

References

Railway stations in France opened in 1876
Railway stations in Aude